Iban Etcheverry (born 23 October 1998) is a French rugby union player. His position is wing and he currently plays for Soyaux Angoulême in the Rugby Pro D2.

International honours

France (U20)
Six Nations Under 20s Championship winners: 2018
World Rugby Under 20 Championship winners: 2018

References

External links
L'Équipe profile

1998 births
Living people
Sportspeople from Bayonne
French rugby union players
Union Bordeaux Bègles players
Rugby union wings
US Colomiers players
SU Agen Lot-et-Garonne players
Soyaux Angoulême XV Charente players